The Strathmore Rockies were a professional women's ice hockey team in the Western Women's Hockey League (WWHL). The team played its home games in Strathmore Family Center Arena, in Strathmore, Alberta, Canada.

History
Their first season in the WWHL was in 2008-09 and its team founders were Samantha Holmes and Brigitte Lessard. The idea to start her own team stemmed from the fact that there were many elite hockey players in Calgary, but not all of them had the opportunity to play for the Calgary Oval X-Treme. Holmes and Lessard founded the Strathmore Rockies so that elite level players in Alberta would have another team to compete for. Holmes also handled the day-to-day tasks of running the Strathmore team. Part of her accomplishments included player scouting, sponsorship and marketing campaigns to operate the team. She was also captain of the Rockies and runs local skills clinics in Calgary for young women's players.

In 2011, The Strathmore Rockies and Edmonton Chimos combined to form the new Team Alberta entry into the Canadian Women's Hockey League (CWHL) which later became the Calgary Inferno.

Season-by-season

Note: GP = Games played, W = Wins, L = Losses, T = Ties, GF = Goals for, GA = Goals against, Pts = Points,

Season standings

Notable player
  Bobbi-Jo Slusar

See also
 Western Women's Hockey League (WWHL)

References

External links
  Strathmore Rockies website
WWHL website

Defunct ice hockey teams in Canada
Ice hockey teams in Alberta
Ice hockey clubs established in 2008
Ice hockey clubs disestablished in 2011
2008 establishments in Alberta
2011 disestablishments in Alberta
Women's ice hockey teams in Canada
Western Women's Hockey League teams
Women in Alberta
Wheatland County, Alberta